Nagamangalam is a village in Devakottai taluk, Sivaganga district, Tamil Nadu, India. As of the 2011 census, Nagamangalam had a total population of 172 with 79 males and 93 females.

References 

Villages in Sivaganga district